Independente Sport Clube is an Angolan football club based in Luena, in Moxico Province.

In 1973 the team has won the Angolan Provincial Championship.

Honours
Girabola: 1973

References

External links
Futebol Clube do Moxico at calciozz.it
Futebol Clube do Moxico at Futebol de Angola

F.C. Moxico